Goeffrey M. Hansen (born September 26, 1959) is an American Republican politician from Michigan who previously served in the Michigan Senate, having served three terms in the Michigan House of Representatives.

Prior to his election to the legislature, he was co-owner and partner of Hansen Foods. Hansen also served for four years as the supervisor of Hart Township.

References

Living people
1959 births
Republican Party members of the Michigan House of Representatives
Republican Party Michigan state senators
People from Hart, Michigan
21st-century American politicians